The 1972 GP Ouest-France was the 36th edition of the GP Ouest-France cycle race and was held on 22 August 1972. The race started and finished in Plouay. The race was won by Robert Bouloux.

General classification

References

1972
1972 in road cycling
1972 in French sport